Strong is the eighth studio album by the Canadian country music artist Michelle Wright. It was released in Canada on July 9, 2013, by Savannah Records and in the United States on October 22, 2013.

Critical reception
Markos Papadatos of Digital Journal gave the album a favorable review, writing that "this CD is very uplifting and full of hope and there are no filler tracks on here; moreover, each of the eleven songs has the potential to become a radio single."

Track listing

Chart performance

Singles

References

2013 albums
Michelle Wright albums